"Location" is a song by Colombian singer-songwriter Karol G with Puerto Rican rapper Anuel AA and Colombian singer and rapper J Balvin. It was written by Karol G, Anuel AA, J Balvin and Ovy on the Drums, and produced by the latter. The song was released on February 11, 2021 through Universal Music Latino, as the fourth single from her third studio album KG0516.

Background 
The song was teased multiple time until its announcement hours prior to its release on February 11, 2021.

About the song Karol G stated: "I like to give my fans a unique experience with every single release, both musically and visually. It’s a very special song for me because I was able to collaborate with artists that I admire and we were able to fuse reggaeton/hip-hop/country influences into an amazing song and video filled with energy and rodeo vibes."

Commercial performance 
"Location" debuted and peaked at number 6 on the Billboard Hot Latin Songs chart dated February 27, 2021. It failed to enter the Billboard Hot 100 chart but entered and peaked at number 3 on the US Bubbling Under Hot 100 chart dated February 27, 2021. The song received a 6 times Latin platinum certification by the Recording Industry Association of America (RIAA) on November 24, 2021, for sales of 360,000 equivalent-units.

Awards and nominations

Music video 
The music video for "Location" was directed by Colin Tilley and was released on Karol G’s YouTube channel on February 11, 2021. As of January 2023, it has over 430 million views and 2.6 million likes.

Charts

Certifications

References 

Karol G songs
Anuel AA songs
J Balvin songs
2021 singles
2021 songs
Spanish-language songs
Songs written by Karol G
Songs written by Anuel AA